Revolutionary Tendency was the name of at least two internal factions within Trotskyist organizations in the United States.

Revolutionary Tendency (SWP) which developed within the Socialist Workers Party in the early 1960s.
Revolutionary Tendency within the International Socialists (U.S.) which split in the 1970s to form the Revolutionary Socialist League (US)